The Akademischer Forstgarten Gießen is a historic arboretum and botanical garden in the Schiffenberger Wald on Schiffenberger Weg, Gießen, Hesse, Germany. It opens daily with free admission.

The garden dates to 1778 when the University of Giessen added a career in forestry, making it the oldest department of this kind in the world. Its first forest garden was founded in 1802.

The Hessian Forest College was founded in 1825, and merged into the University of Giessen in 1831.

Carl Justus Heyer, who directed the garden from 1830–31 and 1835–1856, was also responsible for the Botanischer Garten Gießen.

In 1938, the Forest Institute was relocated to the University of Göttingen, and the Akademischer Forstgarten Gießen fell into disuse. Today it still contains more than 200 tree and shrub species.

See also 
 List of botanical gardens in Germany

References

External links
 Lugena: Akademischer Forstgarten Gießen
 Klaus Schwarz, Der Akademische Forstgarten in Gießen: Ein forstgeschichtliches und forstbotanisches Lehrgebiet, Schutzgemeinschaft Deutscher Wald, Gießen, 1988. .
 Klaus Schwarz, "Der Akademische Forstgarten: Symbol der Gießener Forstwissenschaft", in 400 Jähre Universität Gießen, pages 206–211. 

Giessen, Akademischer Forstgarten
Giessen, Akademischer Forstgarten
Forestry in Germany
History of forestry education
University of Giessen